RABI (born David Emanuel Mordechai Torres in 1984) is a first generation American  visual artist of Puerto Rican and Polish descent from Los Angeles, California. He is known for being part of the artist collective, CYRCLE. RABI's works can be seen in public and private collections including that of Shepard Fairey, Ari Emanuel, Sean Combs, Museo de Arte Contemporáneo de Puerto Rico, MOCA Detroit, MGM Grand in Las Vegas, The Art of Elysium, and the Contemporary Art Center in New Orleans.

Career
RABI's works stem from his early life as a graffiti writer, skateboarder and muralist. Through skateboarding and graffiti, RABI began practicing art in public spaces, as well as capturing his personal world through video and photography. Themes of contradiction, duality, and sociopolitical philosophy become visible throughout RABI's work. In 2009 RABI co-founded the art collective CYRCLE along with David Leavitt and Devin Liston (Liston left in 2012), which gained international notoriety and allowed for him to take his love for public installation to a worldwide audience.

He spent a full decade building CYRCLE while growing his skills in video, design, photography, painting and sculpture. During this time he worked throughout Europe, Asia, Africa, Australia, and North America. While working with CYRCLE, RABI collaborated with artists, brands and non-profits including, HBO, Uber, Pharrell, TED Prize winner- JR, James Lavelle, Chad Muska, Woodkid, AIDS Healthcare Foundation, and Audi, among others.

In 2021 RABI was commissioned by Firestone Walker Brewing Company in Venice to paint a large-scale mural on the building. That same year he was chosen to participate in the worldwide street art campaign, #NOTACRIME for educational equality in Iran. RABI's mural was painted over the summer in New York and the piece directly confronts the shattered educational system, "a result of an entire minority being barred just because of their beliefs." The mural is in keeping with his previous work – all of which has focused on society and the human condition. The owner of a nearby building, overlooking the Nelson Mandela Memorial Garden at the corner of Frederick Douglass Boulevard and 126th Street, offered the wall of her building to help the project.

One year later, in 2022 RABI held his first large solo exhibition, after his time in Street art collective, CYRCLE, titled gen+esc (generation+escape). This was also his directorial debut. The show opened on September 15, 2022 in West Hollywood, California, at Nomad Gallery and ran through October 15, 2022. The exhibition was a series of short art films that “explored the relationship between identity and the artistic process.”  Each short-film cross-examined  “the role of image in personal narratives and reimagines the embodiment of self, depicting a world free of conventional posturing,” said RABI. An interactive experience, guests were invited to utilize AR technology that cast imagery onto green-screen components throughout the space, including the building’s facade and different sculptures while experiencing the show. Exclusive NFTs and prints were available throughout the exhibition for purchase as well.

Selected exhibitions and works
2022, RABI, _gen+esc, Nomad Gallery, Los Angeles, CA USA
2019 Rabi x JR Collaboration, Branded Arts Maya Angelou Mural Festival, Los Angeles, CA USA 
2015 NOTHING EXISTS, Montreal, Canada
2012 ORGANIZED CHAOS!, Los Angeles, CA USA 
2011 CYRCLE, WE NEVER DIE!, Design Matters, Los Angeles, CA USA

References

External links
https://rabitowing.com/
Art Around The World: Dr. Maya Angelou High School Mural Festival, LA WEEKLY, July 2019
Maya Angelou Mural - Rabi & JR Collaboration Via Branded Arts, This Is Colossal, July 2019 
Maya Angelou Mural Festival, Rabi & JR Collaboration Via Branded Arts, Unframed, LACMA.org, July 18, 2019
Shepard Fairey, JR, and Other Artists Painted Murals Honoring Maya Angelou at a High School, Art Net, June 2019
RABI of CYRCLE teams up again with French artist JR’s inside out project, Maya Angelou Mural Festival 2019, Graffiti Street, June 2019
RABI Remixes Reality At Nomad Gallery, LA Weekly, September 2022

American contemporary artists
Living people
American installation artists
American artist groups and collectives
Year of birth missing (living people)